The 3rd Baltic Front was a front of the Red Army during the Second World War. It was set up on 21 April 1944 and disbanded on 16 October that year after a series of campaigns in the Baltic states that culminated with the capture of Riga October 13–15, 1944. During 179 days of existence, the 3rd Baltic Front suffered 43,155 killed and missing in action as well as 153,876 wounded, sick, and frostbitten personnel. The sole commander of the 3rd Baltic Front was Ivan Maslennikov.

The headquarters of the 3rd Baltic Front was formed from that of the disbanded 20th Army, and the field armies subordinated to the front were taken from the left (south) wing of the Leningrad Front. Operations that the 3rd Baltic Front took part in include the Pskov-Ostrov Operation and the Tartu Operation. Upon the capture of Riga, the Soviet high command disbanded the 3rd Baltic Front as a headquarters and reassigned its component armies.

Citations and Sources 

Baltic 3